Buduruwagala is an ancient buddhist temple in Sri Lanka. The complex consists of seven statues and belongs to the Mahayana school of thought. The statues date back to the 10th century. The gigantic Buddha statue still bears traces of its original stuccoed robe and a long streak of orange suggests it was once brightly painted. The central of the three figures to the Buddha's right is thought to be the Buddhist mythological figure-the Bodhisattva Avalokitesvara. To the left of this white painted figure is a female figure in the thrice-bent posture, which is thought to be his consort-Tara.

Name
Buduruvagala means "the rock of Buddhist Sculptures". The name Buduruwagala is derived from the words for Buddha (Budu), images (ruva) and stone (gala). Most visitors, especially Buddhists, who attend the temple will make sure to visit Buduruvagala.

Location

Size of the statues

History
Authorities generally date them to the 9th or 10th century.
Buduruvagala does not have much historical records. Even its original name is unknown. It is thought to be a hermitage for monks.
The sculptures of Buduruvagala also include many sculptures of Bodhisattva images including Mahayana tradition.

The mustard oil lamp
It is of the shape of a flame. The inside wall of this carved shape is always wet of an oil that smells very much like Mustard oil. This oil comes to the carved shape with no explainable source or reason.

See also
 Buduruwagala Museum
 Maligawila Buddha statue
 Dematamal viharaya
 Yudaganawa

References

Buddhist temples in Monaragala District
Colossal Buddha statues
Monuments and memorials in Sri Lanka
Rock art in Asia
Archaeological protected monuments in Monaragala District